The Vàm Cỏ Đông River is a river of Vietnam. It flows through the provinces of Tây Ninh, Long An and is 220 kilometres long.It is part of the Đồng Nai River system.

Rivers of Tây Ninh province
Landforms of Long An province
Rivers of Vietnam